Qibin District is a district of the city of Hebi, Henan province, China.

Administrative divisions
Longzihu District is divided to 1 subdistrict, 2 towns, 2 townships and 1 other.
Subdistricts
Jinshan Subdistrict

Towns
Dalaidian
Jiuqiao

Townships
Dahejian Township
Shangyu Township

Others
Qibin Economic and Technological Development Zone

References

County-level divisions of Henan
Hebi